Uvatsky District  is an administrative district (raion), one of the twenty-two in Tyumen Oblast, Russia. As a municipal division, it is incorporated as Uvatsky Municipal District. It is located in the northern and northeastern parts of the oblast. Its administrative center is the rural locality (a selo) of Uvat. Population: 19,452 (2010 Census);  The population of Uvat accounts for 25.5% of the district's total population.

References

Notes

Sources

Districts of Tyumen Oblast